Birchy Cove is a local service district and designated place in the Canadian province of Newfoundland and Labrador.

It is located on the Bonavista Bay side of the Bonavista Peninsula, 2.5 km from Newman's Cove, and 8.4 km from the Town of Bonavista.

Geography 
Birchy Cove is in Newfoundland within Subdivision G of Division No. 7.

Demographics 

Government 
Birchy Cove is a local service district (LSD) that is governed by a committee responsible for the provision of certain services to the community. The chair of the LSD committee is Reg Durdle.

See also 
List of communities in Newfoundland and Labrador
List of designated places in Newfoundland and Labrador
List of local service districts in Newfoundland and Labrador

References 

Designated places in Newfoundland and Labrador
Local service districts in Newfoundland and Labrador